Christian Meili (born 7 January 1963) is a Swiss bobsledder who has competed in the early 1990s. Competing in two Winter Olympics, he earned his best finish of fifth in the four-man event at Albertville in 1992.

Meili is still active as an official with the St. Moritz bobsleigh club.

References
1992 bobsleigh two-man results
 1992 bobsleigh four-man results
 1994 bobsleigh four-man results
Omega watches bobsleigh featuring picture of Meili 

1963 births
Bobsledders at the 1992 Winter Olympics
Bobsledders at the 1994 Winter Olympics
Living people
Swiss male bobsledders
Olympic bobsledders of Switzerland